Skip Day (also called Senior Day, Senior Skip Day, Ditch Day, Senior Ditch Day, Cut Day, or Senior Cut Day) is a tradition in American schools where students in the senior class skip school. It is commonly held the school day following senior prom or another large event. Often, students will gather at an alternate location during skip day.

School administration reactions can vary greatly in response to Skip Day. Some schools openly encourage the practice, helping the students pick a day to take off and advising teachers not to schedule exams on that day.

There is no generally agreed-upon beginning to the tradition, but there are records of skip days as far back as the 1930s. The film Ferris Bueller's Day Off was a catalyst for several Senior Skip Days in the 1980s and mid 1990s. At Caltech, "Ditch Day" has become an annual tradition.

References

Further reading
 

Student culture in the United States
Unofficial observances
April observances
June observances